Ernesto Gómez may refer to:
Ernesto Gómez Cruz (born 1933), Mexican actor
Ernesto Javier Gómez Barrales (born 1978), Mexican politician
Ernesto Gómez (footballer, born 1982), Spanish footballer
Ernesto Gómez (footballer, born 1985), Spanish footballer
Ernesto Gómez (footballer, born 1994), Spanish footballer

See also:
Ricardo Ernesto Gómez (born 1981), Argentine footballer